Bruce is a small lunar impact crater located in the small lunar mare Sinus Medii. It lies to the west-northwest of the irregular crater Rhaeticus, and is about 33 km to the west of the even smaller Blagg. It is named for Catherine Wolfe Bruce, an American philanthropist and patroness of astronomy.

This feature is circular and cup-shaped, with no notable impacts overlaying the rim or interior. The interior has a generally higher albedo than the surrounding terrain, but there is a band of darker material cross the midpoint of the crater from west to east. It is surrounded by lunar mare, with a few tiny craterlets in the surface to the east.

Less than forty kilometres to the south-southeast is the original point of the selenographic coordinate system. From the floor of this crater the Earth always appears at the zenith. Both the Surveyor 4 and Surveyor 6 probes landed about 50 km to the west-southwest of Bruce.

References

External links

Bruce at The Moon Wiki

Impact craters on the Moon